Ezra Ames (May 5, 1768 – February 23, 1836) was a popular portrait painter in Albany, New York, during the late 18th and early 19th centuries.  More than 700 portraits have been attributed to him.

Life and career
He was born in Framingham, Massachusetts, in 1768.  He moved to Worcester, Massachusetts, in 1790, and married Zipporah Wood in 1794. Some time later he moved to Albany, New York, where he painted a number of prominent people, including early portraits of Governor George Clinton and Alexander Hamilton.

It is not known whether Ames was formally trained or not, but his work had a popular appeal. In addition to portraits and landscapes, Ames' surviving accounts books indicated he painted miniatures, carriages, fire buckets, fences, mirror frames, and furniture.

Ames painted a number of still lifes, landscapes, and history paintings, and was skilled at engraving. The Chautauqan Magazine describes his importance in this way; "(he) was the most noted portraitist in the state, outside New York city. The sure and fluent ease of his brush, his keen characterization, his pure, fresh coloring, are all remarkable for this early period. His portrait of Governor George Clinton, exhibited at the Pennsylvania Academy in 1812, won him wide notice; but he did delightful work some years earlier, and many even finer canvases are scattered through the middle states, in private hands."

During his career Ames painted many members of the New York State legislature and retired comfortably on his savings built up during his prolific career, primarily between 1800 and 1820. In fact he became known unofficially as the (official) New York State portrait painter. Ames was an active freemason, which brought him a number of commissions from his fellows.

Ames served as chairman of the Fine Arts Committee of the Society for the Promotion of Useful Arts in 1805, and was also President of the Mechanics' and Farmers' Bank of Albany.

He died in 1836 and is buried at the Albany Rural Cemetery (Lot 1 Section 59). Ames was posthumously elected an honorary member of the American Academy of Fine Arts in New York City.

Ames had three children, two of whom followed him into the business: Angelo Ames and Julius Rubens Ames (1801–1850).

Paintings by Ezra Ames

References

Who Was Who in America: Historical Volume, 1607-1896. Chicago: Marquis Who's Who, 1963.

Sources
Albany Institute of History and Art article
New York State Museum article

External links
Ezra Ames at American Art Gallery

1768 births
1836 deaths
18th-century American painters
18th-century American male artists
American male painters
19th-century American painters
Artists from Albany, New York
Burials at Albany Rural Cemetery
People from Framingham, Massachusetts
Painters from Massachusetts
Painters from New York (state)
People of colonial Massachusetts
19th-century American male artists